Sound Transit Express (ST Express) is a network of regional express buses, operated by the multi-county transit agency, Sound Transit. The routes connect major regional hubs throughout 53 cities in three counties (King, Pierce, and Snohomish) in the Puget Sound region. Sound Transit Express ranks first in the nation in the number of commuter bus passengers carried and in vehicle miles driven. The first nine routes and 114 buses began carrying passengers on September 19, 1999.

Unlike a typical transit bus, Sound Transit Express routes typically make limited stops as they travel longer distances on the freeways. Most routes operate seven days a week, with runs throughout the day. Where available, buses use transit-only lanes, high-occupancy vehicle lanes, high-occupancy toll lanes, express lanes and direct access ramps to speed travel times.

While Sound Transit oversees, plans, and funds the service, operation and maintenance of the buses is contracted out to Community Transit (who subcontracts with First Transit), King County Metro and Pierce Transit.

Fares
ST Express uses a flat fare system, where each ride costs the same regardless of distance.

The fares are as follows:

Paper transfers are not accepted or issued on Sound Transit routes. Passengers who use ORCA may transfer between ST routes or routes operated by most other agencies within two hours of initial payment. If the fare for the second route is higher, the difference will be charged.

Routes

27 Sound Transit Express bus routes are overseen by the agency. Buses are operated under contract by King County Metro, Pierce Transit and Community Transit (who subcontracts with First Transit). When Sound Transit implements a new bus route, changes are frequently made to existing routes that serve the area to avoid overlapping.

The ST Express routes and operators  are:

Fleet
Sound Transit owns a fleet of 360 buses operated by three different local transit agencies. Sound Transit buses are painted white with aqua, turquoise, and blue waves along the sides, representing the Puget Sound region ST Express serves, and most feature a freely-adapted representation of the Sound Transit bus and train system map on the seating fabric.

Occasionally, vehicles that are not in Sound Transit livery are used on Sound Transit routes by the operating agencies. Also, Sound Transit vehicles may also be used by the local agencies for other commuter routes. This is due to vehicles having mechanical problems, vehicle allocation issues, and assignment errors.

Retired fleet

References

External links

ST Express Rider Guide

 
 
1999 establishments in Washington (state)
Bus transportation in Washington (state)
Intermodal transportation authorities in Washington (state)
Transit authorities with natural gas buses
Transportation in King County, Washington
Transportation in Pierce County, Washington
Transportation in Snohomish County, Washington